Hairpins is a 1920 American silent drama film directed by Fred Niblo. A surviving print is held in a private collection.

Plot
Rex Rossmore (Moore) disgust at the hairpin-strewing, straggly locks of his young bride Muriel (Bennett) and her concentration upon extra-particularness in her housekeeping make it easy for him to forsake her company outside the home for that of his stenographer Effie Wainwright (Livingston). Overhearing her husband's confession of her failure as a wife to him as he makes it to his employer, she considers suicide. Making herself orderly for death, she discovers that she is beautiful in life, and conceives a plan whereby she plays an affair of her own against that of her husband and stenographer, acquaints herself with the ways of the gay world and practices them until her husband's rage brings issue to their artificial existences. This reveals to the man that his love is to the woman herself, after all, and not to her fashionable habiliments. This readjustment is certain to reflect a compromise in several things after a reconciliation is brought about after the husband discovers that another man is in love with his wife.

Cast
 Enid Bennett as Muriel Rossmore
 Matt Moore as Rex Rossmore
 William Conklin as Hal Gordon
 Margaret Livingston as Effie Wainwright
 Grace Morse as Mrs. Kent
 Al W. Filson as John Burman (credited as Al Filson)
 Aggie Herring as The Maid

References

External links

1920 films
1920 drama films
Silent American drama films
American silent feature films
American black-and-white films
Films directed by Fred Niblo
1920s American films